Carlos Julio Arosemena Tola Canton is a canton of Ecuador, located in the Napo Province.  Its capital is the town of Carlos Julio Arosemena Tola.  Its population at the 2001 census was 2,943.

References

Cantons of Napo Province